Tull Gasmann (6 July 1927 – 14 December 2005) was a Norwegian alpine skier. She was born in Aker. She participated at the 1952 Winter Olympics in Oslo, where she competed in slalom and giant slalom.

She became Norwegian champion in slalom in 1951.

References

External links

1927 births
2005 deaths
Alpine skiers from Oslo
Norwegian female alpine skiers
Olympic alpine skiers of Norway
Alpine skiers at the 1952 Winter Olympics